(January 28, 1954 – May 14, 2021), known professionally as Jaime Garza, was a Mexican actor.

Early life 

Garza was the son of journalist Ramiro Garza and the poetess Carmen Alardín, brother of actress Ana Silvia Garza, and uncle to the actress and singer Mariana Garza. He studied acting at the National Autonomous University of Mexico UNAM (Spanish: Universidad Nacional Autónoma de México). He made his acting debut in 1973 on the Mexican children's program Plaza Sésamo, and his first telenovela was Pacto de amor in 1977.

Personal life

In 1982 his girlfriend, Viridiana Alatriste Pinal died tragically in an automobile accident after a party at Garza's house in Mexico City on October 25, 1982. In 2010 he suffered a stroke that required surgery, and in 2014, Garza lost his right leg due to complications from diabetes. Garza died in May 2021 in Mexico City.

Filmography

Telenovelas

Film

Awards and nominations

References

External links
 

1954 births
2021 deaths
Mexican male actors
National Autonomous University of Mexico alumni
People from Monterrey